Puderbach is a municipality in the district of Neuwied, in Rhineland-Palatinate, Germany. It is situated in the Westerwald, approx. 25 km north of Koblenz.

Puderbach is the seat of the Verbandsgemeinde ("collective municipality") Puderbach.

References

Neuwied (district)